The men's hammer throw event at the 1930 British Empire Games was held on 21 August at the Civic Stadium in Hamilton, Canada.

Results

References

Athletics at the 1930 British Empire Games
1930